Harold C. Raley, born  in Hartselle, Alabama, is an American Hispanist, philosopher and writer. A retired university professor, he has excelled, above all, as a scholar and translator of the work of Julián Marías.

Biography 
Harold Cecil Raley received his doctorate from the University of Alabama with a thesis on the work of José Ortega y Gasset. He has been a professor at the University of Oklahoma, as well as at the University of Houston, and dean and professor at Houston Baptist University (named "Distinguished Professor"). He is, according to Julián Marías, "the best Hispanist of our time".

Married to Victoria González in 1962, they are the parents of David, Laura and Ana.

Thinking 
According to José Luis Pinillos, "Raley shares with Ortega and Marías the idea that the point of view constitutes an essential ingredient of reality." Raley disagrees with Nelson Orringer, Ciriaco Morón Arroyo, Molinuevo and others, who considered, in general, that Ortega repeated in Spanish what he had learned in Germany, but states that the philosopher from Madrid began, disagreeing with his Germanic sources, another path, a "turning point": Ortega abandoned phenomenology as soon as he received it, and therefore did not have a "phenomenological" phase, but much of his work was devoted to overcoming it. Raley also shows how Ortega found the epokhé or phenomenological reduction impossible: for Ortega the primary datum is not the consciousness of phenomena, but the living man or woman, the person that I am: "the "consciousness of phenomena", but rather the living man or woman, the person that I am".

Work 

 Ortega y Gasset, filósofo de la unidad europea (prólogo de Julián Marías), traducción española de Ernestina de Champourcín, Revista de Occidente, Madrid, 1977. . Edición inglesa: José Ortega y Gasset, the Philosopher of European Unity. The University of Alabama Press, Alabama, 1971. 
 La visión responsable. La filosofía de Julián Marías (prólogo de José Luis Pinillos), traducción española de César Armando Gómez, Espasa-Calpe, Madrid, 1977. . Edición inglesa: Responsible Vision: The Philosophy of Julián Marías, The American Hispanist, Indiana, 1980. 
 Julián Marías. Una filosofía desde dentro, traducción española de César Armando Gómez, Alianza Editorial, Madrid, 1997. ; edición inglesa: A Watch over Mortality: the Philosophical Story of Julián Marías, The State University of New York Press, Albany, 1997. 
 El espíritu de España (prólogo de Julián Marías), traducción española de César Armando Gómez, Alianza Editorial, Madrid, 2003. . Edición inglesa: The Spirit of Spain, Halcyon Press, Houston, 2002. 
 The Light of Eden. A Christian Worldview (foreword by David B. Capes, Ph.D., chair of Christianity and Philosophy, Houston Baptist University), John M. Hardy Publishing, Houston, 2008. 
 The Unknown God: Mysteries of Deity, Time, Space, and Creation, Createspace Independent Publishing Platform, North Charleston, 2011. . Traducción española de Enrique González Fernández: El Dios desconocido, TotallRecalll Publications, Friendswood, 2019. 
 Immortal Destiny, TotalRecall Publications, Friendswood, 2018. 
 Language Oddities. Quirks and Curiosities of English and Other Languages, Kingsle, Houston, 2011. 
 Louisiana Rogue. The Life and Times of Pierre Prospère-Tourmoulin translated by Peter Tourmoulin, Lamar University Press, Beaumont, Texas, 2013. 
 José Ortega y Gasset: a bibliography of secondary sources (with Antón Donoso), Bowling Green State University, Ohio, 1986. 
 Radical and Empirical Reality. Selected Writings on the Philosophy of José Ortega y Gasset and Julián Marías, TotalRecall Publications, Friendswood, 2020.

Translations 

 Julián Marías: America in the Fifties and Sixties: Julián Marías on the United States (translated from the Spanish by Blanche De Puy and Harold C. Raley; edited and with an Introduction by Michael Aaron Rockland), The Pennsylvania State University Press, University Park and London, 1972. 
 Julián Marías: A Biography of Philosophy (translated by Harold C. Raley), The University of Alabama Press, Alabama, 1984. 
 Julián Marías: The structure of society (translated by Harold C. Raley; introduction by Robert K. Merton), The University of Alabama Press, Alabama, 1987. 
 Julián Marías: Generations: a historical method (translated by Harold C. Raley), The University of Alabama Press, Alabama, 1970. 
 Julián Marías: The Christian Perspective (translated from Spanish by Harold Raley), Halcyon Press, Houston, 2000. 
 Enrique González Fernández: The Beauty of Christ. A philosophical understanding of the Gospel (prologue by Julián Marías, Royal Spanish Academy, translated from the Spanish by Harold C. Raley), Cultiva, Madrid, 2011.

Prologues 

 Julián Marías: Historia de la filosofía (prologue with Xavier Zubiri; epilogue with José Ortega y Gasset), Alianza Editorial, Madrid, 2016. 
 Enrique González Fernández: Julián Marías, apóstol de la divina razón, San Pablo, Madrid, 2017.

References

External links 

 Analecta Husserliana
 University of Houston Libraries
 Universidad Católica de Valencia
 Página en Dialnet
 Revue Internationale de Philosophie
 Library of Congress
 Diario ABC
 Diario ABC
 José Ortega y Gasset: Philosopher of European Unity
 Julián Marías: Philosophy of the Person

1934 births
Living people
American philosophers
American Hispanists
20th-century American non-fiction writers
21st-century American non-fiction writers